Cabatuan, officially the Municipality of Cabatuan, is a 3rd class municipality in the province of Isabela, Philippines. According to the 2020 census, it has a population of 39,990 people.

Being a major rice producing town, it is the home of several rice mills and rice traders, dubbed as the Land of the Golden Grains.

Etymology
When the act of throwing stones called "ambatuan" then it was evolved to "cabatuan" when Ilocano people who settled in the area used stones to drive away Kalingas.

History
The early inhabitants of the vast forest land were the Kalingas who are indigenous to the mountain provinces. These settlers lived on tree houses which they built along the banks of the bountiful and mighty Magat River. These sturdy, dark complexioned, G-stringed, soldier-like people depended on hunting, fishing and a little agriculture and poultry.

In 1912, the pioneering Ilocanos started arriving with their families, relatives and friends. The Ilocanos settled away from the river but the Kalingas considered it an intrusion which later led to the encounters where the Ilocanos used piles of stones to drive away the ferocious Kalingas. The act of throwing stones was called “ambatuan” which later evolved to “cabatuan”. The warring groups eventually became friends through a peace pact led by their respective leaders and the place became known as Cabatuan.

In 1914, Cabatuan was incorporated with the Municipality of Cauayan. Many leaders emerged from the Cabatuan settlers and seeing that they are a political threat to the Cauayan leadership, the Municipal Council of Cauayan in 1948 agreed and endorsed the segregation of Cabatuan from the mother town. Through the initiative of the delegation formed by leaders who hailed from Barrio Cabatuan, Executive Order 293 creating the Municipality of Cabatuan was finally signed by President Elpidio R. Quirino in Malacañang on November 5, 1949. On November 30, 1949, the set of municipal officials appointed by President Quirino took their oath of office signaling the independence of Cabatuan from its mother town.

Early Cabatuanenses
The land where Cabatuan now nestles was once teeming with vegetation, wildlife and fish, nurtured by the mighty and winding Magat River. Its history started when one of the indigenous people of the mountain provinces settled down in the vast valley of Cagayan where the Apayaos, Dumagats, Gaddangs, Ibanags, Ifugaos, Igorots, Itawes, Palananons and the Yogads were living. This tribe is known as the Kalingas, the name believed to have come from the Ibanag and Gaddang word, which means "headhunters". The Kalinga villages were strategically located along the banks of the Magat River in south-western Isabela near the boundary of Ifugao province, surrounding the locality now known as Sili, Bolinao, Dalig Kalinga (these places are now barangays of Aurora town) and Subasta (now a sitio of Barangay Saranay in Cabatuan). The early Cabatuanenses were generally known to be medium in height, with dark complexion and lissome with high nose bridges. Physically, they were very sturdy and well-built so that their war-like bearing feature made them more like soldiers. They lived on tree-houses and depended on hunting, fishing and a little of poultry and agriculture. The Kalingas were believed to be the descendants of the second wave of Malay who came to the Islands from Borneo. These pagans were headed by several able leaders like: Ronsan and Ngolan (both from Sili in Aurora town), Balindan, Melad and Gombi (from Bolinao, also in Aurora town), Tullayao Bayudoc (from Subasta, Saranay in Cabatuan) and the grand old chieftain Materig (also from Sili in Aurora town).

The Kalingas preferred to stay in the Cabatuan area of jurisdiction rather than in Aurora because the town proper of Aurora then was located in Dalig, now a barangay of Burgos town.

When the Christians arrived, the Kalingas attached the word "Infiel" before their native name to fulfill their yearning for a second name like those of Christians. The name "Infiel" was derived from "ynfieles", a Spanish friar's term for non-believers of the Christian faith.

Pioneering Ilocanos
After the Ilocano migrants, several waves of settlers particularly locals from Pangasinan and Central Luzon region came to Isabela as merchants. Some of the Pangasinan pioneers were: Nicolas T. Almirol (original surname is Lagasca), Benito Monte, Hermogenes B. Soriben and Zacarias P. Munoz.

Some of the Tagalog migrants were: Carlino O. Munsayac (Nueva Ecija), Atanasio H. Dayrit (San Fernando, Pampanga), Atty. Rafael M. Tomacruz (then Mayor of Hagonoy, Bulacan and Provincial Board Member), Anselmo S. Esmino (Licab, Nueva Ecija), Mr. Pamintuan (Pampanga), Andres Alivia (Rizal, Nueva Ecija) and Antonio V. Altoveros (Rizal, Nueva Ecija).

The Chinese also migrated to Cabatuan and opted to permanently reside in the locality and inter-married with young Ilocano maidens. The bulk of the Chinese migrants came from Amoy, China in the 1930s. The Chinese migrants were: Clemente Paggabao (married Andrea Labasan), Eusebio Uy (married Lourdes Visaya), Juan Uy (married Felisa Acio), Mariano Uy (married Lourdes dela Cruz), Kaya Uy (married Carmen Rambac), Inocencio Uy (married Mercedes Domingcil), Francisco Uy (married Mercedes Llamelo), Guillermo Uy (married Tomasa Padron), Lorenzo Uy (married Teodora Visaya), Venancio Tio (married Monica Acorda), Vicente Pua (married Sabina Ventura), Joaquin Pua (married Entonia Labayog), Pedro Pua (married Isabela Guerrero), Kiana Uy (married Claudia Manuel), Pascual Pua (married Carmen Uy), Densoy Ty (married Maxima Uy), Tomas Uy, Miguel Dy, Mariano Tio, Julian Pua (married Felicitas Bagcal), Eusebio Tan (married Eusenia Lomotan), Jose Uy (married Adelina Ventura), Ben Chong (married Gue Eng Tio), Alfonso Uy (married Engracia Uy), Sytong Uy, Uwa Uy (married Avelina Gervacio), Ben Co (married Maria Vea), Pedro Ong (married Salud Bacallan), Pedro Tan (married Maria Aczon), Tio Nga Luy (married Pelagia Acosta), Alfredo Uy (married Ruperta V. Pancho)

As a barrio of Cauayan
In 1914, during the American Regime, Cabatuan was incorporated with the Municipality of Cauayan, Isabela with Senor Agapito A. Pilar as the first Barrio Teniente. Others who assumed the post were: Florencio Abad, Leocadio Acio, Pedro Acob, Felipe Aczon, Tomas Camungao, T. Damunglo, Jose Castillo, Cirilo Guerrero, Platon Guillermo, Ignacio Juan, Antonio S. Medina, Felipe Pascual, Feliciano A. Ramos, Roman Rivera, Inigo Sales, Francisco Salvador, Tirso Santos, B. Sumawang, Juan Ventura. Don Bernardo C. Dacuycuy, the acknowledged founder of Cabatuan, was appointed by Governor-General Leonard Wood as President of the Confederate Districts of Antatet (now Luna town), Dalig (former poblacion of Aurora town and now a barangay of Burgos town), Bolinao and Sili (now barangays of Aurora town). Later on, Cabatuan was sub-divided into four districts. District 1, comprises what is now the barangays of Sampaloc and Saranay. District 2, the barrio proper, comprises what is now the barangays of Centro and San Andres. District 3, comprises what is now the barangays of Del Pilar, Magdalena and portions of Paraiso. And District 4, comprises all populated areas upstream the Magat River like Macalaoat, Culing and Diamantina.

Early politics
The desire to have a representation for the Magat region prompted the Cabatuanenses to support the candidacy of several of their barrio folks. Thus, the administrations of Cauayan Municipal Mayors Guillermo Blas (1938) and Zoilo Cuntapay (1938-1940), three of their Municipal Councilors hailed from Cabatuan. They were: Paz Sales-Cruz, Francisco Razon and Atanasio H. Dayrit. And realizing that men and women of Barrio Cabatuan has the potential and capacity to lead the whole town of Cauayan, the Cabatuanenses rallied behind the candidacy of Federico P. Acio as mayor. Acio won and assumed office in 1941 but his term was cut short when the Japanese Imperial Army occupied the valley. Acio was replaced by the appointment of Jose Canciller.

Second World War
When the Second World War erupted, several sons and daughters of Cabatuan were involved in various encounters in the countryside. The brave and freedom loving Cabatuanenses who fought for democracy in Bataan were: Norberto V. Abad (suffered the Death March), Dominador Acob (suffered the Death March), Victorino R. Agustin, Leopoldo Cadeliria (suffered the Death March), Alejandro A. Cadiente (suffered the Death March), Ventura D. Frogoso, Elpidio A. Galiza, Domingo J. Marcelo, Juan B. Molina (suffered the Death March), Ranulfo Navarro, Andres N. Palado, Cenon B. Ramos, Jose M. Rivera, Florencio B. Sacaben (suffered the Death March), Simeon B. Santos, Victorino O. Santos (missing in action), Lorenzo T. Sunga, Manuel T. Talimada, Damian S. Tomacruz and Hermogenes S. Tomas. Though the island of Corregidor and the peninsula of Bataan became the concentration of the war, many provinces in Luzon Island also participated in the fighting. The Cabatuanenses who fought outside Bataan were: Benedicto A. Acosta (Ilocos), Teodoro P. Asuncion (died in action in Tuguegarao, Cagayan), Sebastian M. Ballesteros (Ilocos), Rizalino M. Camungao (died in action in Batangas), Florencia M. Dacuycuy (Women's Auxiliary Service in Ilocos) and Enrique Padron (died in action in Tuguegarao, Cagayan).

As the Japanese Imperial Army occupied the valley after the Fall of Bataan, strong resistance continued. Many gallant Cabatuanenses joined the underground "guerilla" movement, locally known as the Bolo Unit as they continue their quest for freedom. The Guerillas from Cabatuan were: Federico P. Acio, Damaso A. Acosta, Mariano P. Alejo, Antonio V. Altoveros, Nestor R. Altoveros, Alvaro C. Antolin, Rufino D. Apostol, Benito G. Bauzon, Osmundo S. Bungay, Pacifico S. Cabantac, Felix G. Cadelina, Norberto Cadiz, Demetrio dela Cruz, Leonides R. Dacuycuy, Gavino K. Enerlan, Fernando A. Ferrer, Apolonio R. Galicano, Patrocinio Gamiao, Venancio Galingana, Santos D. Gonatise, Iluminado Grande, Lino P. Gumaru, Jose G. Hermogela, Nicolas Labayog, Juan R. Labuguen, Celestino G. Lomboy, Cenon S. Manibog, Venancio G. Manibog, Juan G. Manuel, Isaac I. Martinez, Cipriano D. Mercado, Nicolas Meria, Miguel O. Monte, Sixta C Juan, Dionisio B Juan,Andres E. Nomina, Domingo Pedro, Nemesio N. Ramil, Antonio B. Rodriguez, Cayetano K. Rosario, Teodulfo D. Rumbaoa, Maura A. Sales, Domingo D. Salgado, Severino Tarapia, Juanito S. Topinio, Juan P. Valeroso, Avelino A. Villanueva, Vicente Villar and Juan G. Visaya.

Mayor Acio was one of the remaining mayors of northern Luzon who have not surrendered to the Japanese. The foreign invaders tried to make Acio surrender by torturing his wife, Josefa Ventura-Acio, through "water treatment". In reality, the poor Mrs. Acio never knew the whereabouts of her husband and her suffering continued until before Liberation.

The tabacalera (almasin), now owned by Senor Bernardo Bulosan Garcia Sr married to Efrenia Tejada Ancheta, in District (now Barangay San Andres) became the chief garrison (Center of Command) of the invading foreigners. Other prominent Japanese garrisons were the residences of Federico Acio, Francisco Acob and Daniel Crisologo. The ever-fighting guerillas continued their underground activities and were fully supported by the barrio people. The Niponggo troops made plans to liquidate this stubborn resistance. The Japanese soldiers hired Filipinos to serve as "magic eyes" (Makapili) to pinpoint those who were supporters and members of the movement. The civilians who were unfortunate to be tagged and assassinated were: Catalino Pascual, Ireneo Acedo, Severino Tarampi and a certain Mr. Gomez. There was also an incident where the Japanese kidnapped a lady by the name of Genoveva A. Agsalda (residing in what is now Barangay San Andres) while reaping tobacco in her field (in Sili, Aurora) and never to be found again.

When the "liberating" American warplanes arrived, a house in District Dos (now San Andres) where at least two families were residing was mistakenly identified as a Japanese camp. The house was heavily bombarded killing all the inhabitants of the compound. The fatalities were: Agustin Duldulao and wife Josefa Mercado with sister Teodorica M. Visaya. The Duldulao children were: Aprecion, Emeteria, Severo, Angel, Teofilo and the eldest, Demetrio and wife Demetria Aczon with their three-months old baby girl, Angeles.

Geography
Cabatuan occupies a land area of 7,200 hectares. It lies in the south-western part of the Province of Isabela bounded on the north by the Municipality of Aurora, on the east by the Municipality of Luna, on the west by the Municipality of San Mateo and on the south by the City of Cauayan. Its territorial boundaries are more specifically delineated under Executive Order 293 issued by President Elpidio Quirino on November 5, 1949.

Barangays
Upon the creation of Cabatuan in 1949, twelve barrios were extracted from the mother-town of Cauayan. They were: Cabatuan (as the seat of government), Buenavista, Caggong, Canan, Culing, Diamantina, Luzon, Macalaoat, Magdalena, Namnama, Tandul Viejo and Villa Visaya. The three sitios were: Nueva Era, Sampaloc and Saranay.

In 1951, a major re-organization was made creating the new barrios of: Calaocan (from Culing), Centro East (from the old Barrio of Cabatuan-poblacion), Centro West (from the old Barrio of Cabatuan-poblacion), La Paz (from Canan and Namnama), Nueva Era 1 (from Culing), Nueva Era 2 (from Culing), Sampaloc and Saranay. Barrio Buenavista, on the other hand, was joined with Barrio Caggong while Barrio Villa Visaya was also incorporated with Barrio Diamantina.

In 1956, two additional barrios were formed. Barrio Del Pilar was created from Magdalena while Barrio Del Corpuz was extracted from Nueva Era 1.

In 1964, Barrio Centro West was renamed to T. Abad honoring one of the founders of Cabatuan, Senor Teodoro Abad while Barrio Centro East was simply called Barrio Centro. Also the same year, Barrio Caggong was re-christened to Rang-ay while Barrio Tandul Viejo was simply called Tandul. Barrio Nueva Era 1 was renamed to Culing West while the remaining fraction of old Culing was called Culing East. Barrio Nueva Era 2 was plainly called Nueva Era.

In 1969, Barrios Culing East and West were chopped to accommodate a new barrio and was named Culing Centro.

The continuous re-organization of the barangay administrative and political set-up divided Barrio Macalaoat and in 1972, the Barrios of Magsaysay and Paraiso were created. The territory of Barrio Magsaysay was derived from the western portion while Barrio Paraiso got its land area at the eastern side of Macalaoat. Also in the same year, Barrio T. Abad was again renamed to San Andres to honor Cabatuan's patron, Saint Andrew the Apostle.

Today the Municipality of Cabatuan has 22 barangays:

Climate

Demographics

Economy 

According to the Bureau of Local Government Finance, the annual regular revenue of Cabatuan for the fiscal year of 2016 was ₱106,631,260.21.

Government

Local government
The municipality is governed by a mayor designated as its local chief executive and by a municipal council as its legislative body in accordance with the Local Government Code. The mayor, vice mayor, and the councilors are elected directly by the people through an election which is being held every three years.

Congress representation
Cabatuan, belonging to the third legislative district of the province of Isabela, currently represented by Hon. Ian Paul L. Dy.

Local elections

2019 elections
The result of the recently conducted local election last May 13, 2019, are as follows;

2016 elections
The result of the recently conducted local election last May 9, 2016, are as follows;

2013 elections
The result of May 13, 2013, are as follows;

Infrastructure

Telecommunication
This town has excellent telecommunications facilities. The PLDT provides fixed line services. Wireless mobile communications services are provided by Smart Communications and Globe Telecommunications. Dito Telecommunity is now available offering connectivity service.

Education
The Schools Division of Isabela governs the town's public education system. The division office is a field office of the DepEd in Cagayan Valley region. The office governs the public and private elementary and public and private high schools throughout the municipality.

Elementary

High school
 Cabatuan National High School
 La Salette of Cabatuan
 Philippine Yuh Chiau School
 Diamantina National High School
 La Paz National High School

References

External links
Municipal Profile at the National Competitiveness Council of the Philippines
Cabatuan at the Isabela Government Website
Local Governance Performance Management System
[ Philippine Standard Geographic Code]
Philippine Census Information
Municipality of Cabatuan

Municipalities of Isabela (province)
Establishments by Philippine executive order